The following is a list of managers of Olympiacos and their major honours from the foundation of the club in 1925 to the present day. As of September 2022, Olympiacos have had 84 managers.

Managers
Only competitive matches are counted
(n/a) = Information not available

List of Olympiacos managers with most games in total
Only managers with known stats are included

Notes

External links

Managers
Olympiacos F.C. managers
Olympiacos F.C.